Marek Solczyński is a Polish prelate of the Catholic Church who joined the diplomatic service of the Holy See in 1993 and served as an Apostolic Nuncio since 2011. He has been Nuncio to Turkey and Azerbaijan since February 2022.

Biography
After studying Theology and Philosophy, Marek Solczyński was ordained a priest on 28 May 1987 by Cardinal Józef Glemp. He then worked as a chaplain in Józefów.

From 1990 to 1992 he completed postgraduate studies at the Pontifical Ecclesiastical Academy and earned a doctorate in canon law. On 1 April 1993, he entered the diplomatic service of the Holy See. His early postings included Russia, the United Nations in New York City,  the United States, Turkey, the Czech Republic and Spain.

Pope Benedict XVI appointed him on 26 November 2011 Titular Archbishop of Caesarea in Mauretania and Apostolic Nuncio to Georgia On 15 December he was named Nuncio to Armenia as well. He received his episcopal consecration from Pope Benedict on the 6 January 2012. On 14 April 2012 he was given the responsibilities of the Apostolic Nuncio to Azerbaijan.

On 25 April 2017, Pope Francis appointed him Apostolic Nuncio to Tanzania.

On 2 February 2022 Pope Francis appointed him Apostolic Nuncio to Türkiye and, on 14 February 2022, to Azerbaijan also. On 8 September 2022 Pope Francis appointed him Apostolic Nuncio to Turkmenistan as well.

See also
 List of heads of the diplomatic missions of the Holy See

References

External links
Catholic Hierarchy: Archbishop Marek Solczyński 

Living people
1961 births
Apostolic Nuncios to Georgia (country)
Apostolic Nuncios to Armenia
Apostolic Nuncios to Turkey
Apostolic Nuncios to Turkmenistan
Apostolic Nuncios to Azerbaijan
Apostolic Nuncios to Tanzania
People from Kalisz County